Sekula may refer to:

Allan Sekula (born 1951), American artist, writer, and critic based at the California Institute of the Arts
John Sekula (1969–2010), the original guitarist for alternative metal band Mushroomhead
Sekula Drljević (1884–1945), World War II Montenegrin Nazi-fascist collaborator
Shelley Sekula-Gibbs (born 1952), physician and a former member of the United States House of Representatives
Sonia Sekula (1918–1963), Swiss-born artist linked with the abstract expressionist movement